Expedition Impossible may refer to:

"Expedition Impossible" (song), a song by the Belgian group Hooverphonic
Expedition Impossible (TV series), a 2011 American reality television series